The Golden Republic is the self-titled debut album by American rock band The Golden Republic, released in the US by Astralwerks on February 8, 2005 (see 2005 in music).

Track listing
All tracks written by The Golden Republic, except where noted.
"The Turning of the World" – 2:05
"You Almost Had It" (The Golden Republic, Deacon Konc) – 2:52
"She's So Cold" – 3:27
"I'll Do Anything" – 3:33
"Rows of People" – 3:52
"NYC" – 3:02
"Things We Do" – 4:37
"Robots" (The Golden Republic, Deacon Konc) – 3:03
"Not My Kind" (The Golden Republic, Deacon Konc) – 2:53
"Full of Yourself" (The Golden Republic, Deacon Konc) – 2:44
"You'll Get Old" – 5:04

2005 debut albums
Astralwerks albums
The Golden Republic albums